Cross-border town naming occurs where towns or villages with the same or equivalent names are divided between two different countries. This does not necessarily imply that those towns or villages are located in geographic proximity or that they are located near a current border (divided cities). Reasons for this taking place may include the following:
 The town or village existed before the border or even before the modern concept of a border. The border was added later (sometimes by war), dividing a community.
 A community on one side of a border grows up to service the border and then takes the name of the adjacent community on the other side of the border.
 Communities grow up on both sides of the border to service the border, taking the name of the border crossing.

Most places are in Europe, but there are also some examples in North America and Asia. In Europe, until the first half of the 20th century and again since the Schengen Agreement in the late 20th century, such divisions could be mostly ignored by the inhabitants.

Examples

Note that this list includes only places with similar names that are in someway connected (by history, geography or otherwise) across modern-day international borders. Towns that have the same name but bear no relationship to each other are also very common but not particularly notable.

Europe

Denmark–Sweden
 Helsingør / Helsingborg

Netherlands–Germany
 Rhederbrug, Rhederveld / Rhede
 Barnflair (Ter Apel) / Barnfleer
 Veenebrugge / Vennebrügge
 Zwillbroek / Zwillbrock
 Ubach over Worms / Übach-Palenberg
 Spijk / Spyck

Netherlands–Belgium
 Baarle-Nassau / Baarle-Hertog
 Clinge / De Klinge
 Koewacht / Koewacht
 Putte / Putte

Belgium–Germany
 Lichtenbusch / Aachen-Lichtenbusch
 Stubach / Stupbach

Luxembourg–Germany
 Obereisenbach, Untereisenbach / Übereisenbach
 Wallendorf-Pont / Wallendorf
 Bollendorf-Pont / Bollendorf
 Echternach / Echternacherbrück
 Wasserbillig / Wasserbilligerbrück

Belgium–France
 Comines-Warneton / Comines
 Wervik / Wervicq-Sud
 Quiévrain / Quiévrechain
 Gœgnies-Chaussée / Gognies-Chaussée
 Grand-Reng / Vieux-Reng

Luxembourg–France
 Mondorf-les-Bains / Mondorff

France–Germany
 Leiding / Leidingen
 Petite-Rosselle / Großrosseln
 Grosbliederstroff / Kleinblittersdorf
 Obergailbach / Niedergailbach
 Scheibenhard / Scheibenhardt
 Lauterbourg / Neulauterburg
 Neuf-Brisach / Breisach
 Kembs / Klein Kembs

France–Switzerland
 Huningue / Kleinhüningen
 Lucelle / Lucelle, Kleinlützel
 Saint-Gingolph / Saint-Gingolph

France–Spain
 Île des Faisans / Isla de los Faisanes (Konpantzia /  Île de l’hôpital / Île de la Conférence)

Germany–Switzerland
 Rheinfelden-Baden (Badisch-Rhyfälde) / Rheinfelden (Rhyfälde)
 Laufenburg / Laufenburg
  / Rekingen

Germany–Austria
 Vorderriß / Hinterriß
 Bayrisch Gmain / Großgmain

Germany–Poland
 Altwarp / Nowe Warpno
 Rosow / Rosówek
 Hohenwutzen / Osinów Dolny (Niederwutzen)*
 Zäckericker Loose / Siekierki (Zäckerick)*
 Güstebieser Loose / Gozdowice (Güstebiese)*
 Altrüdnitzer Ausbau / Stara Rudnica (Altrüdnitz)*
 Neulietzegöricke / Stare Łysogórki (Altlietzegöricke)*
 Zelliner Loose / Czelin (Zellin)*
 Küstrin-Kietz / Kostrzyn nad Odrą (Küstrin)*
 Lebus / Nowy Lubusz (Neulebus)*
 Kunitzer Loose / Kunice (Kunitz)*
 Aurith / Urad (Aurith)*
 Guben / Gubin
 Zelz / Siedlec (Zelz)*
 Klein Priebus / Przewóz (Priebus)*
 Görlitz / Zgorzelec
 Altlandsberg / Gorzów ((Neu))Landsberg)*
 Altentreptow / Trzebiatów (Treptow)*

(*) In some cases there have been added exonyms to show the relationship between the towns more clearly for people not familiar with the respective languages.

Germany–Czech Republic
 Seifhennersdorf / Horní Jindřichův (Oberhennersdorf)*
 Zinnwald / Cínovec (Zinnwald)*
 Deutschgeorgenthal / Český Jiřetín (Georgendorf)*
 Deutscheinsiedel / Mníšek (Böhmisch Einsiedel)*
 Deutschneudorf / Nová Ves v Horách (Gebirgsneudorf)*
 Deutschkatharinenberg / Hora Svaté Kateřiny (Böhmisch Katherinenberg)*
 Hammerunterwiesenthal / České Hamry (Böhmisch Hammer)*
 Oberwiesenthal / Loučna (Böhmisch Wiesenthal)*
 Neualbenreuth / Mýtina (Altalbenreuth)*
 Bayerisch Eisenstein / Železná Ruda (Markt Eisenstein)*

(*) In some cases there have been added exonyms to show the relationship between the towns more clearly for people not familiar with the respective languages.

Czech Republic–Poland
 Pelhřimovy / Pielgrzymów
 Opavice / Opawica
 Krásné Loučky / Krasne Pole
 Chomýž / Chomiąża
 Český Těšín (Czeski Cieszyn)* / Cieszyn
 Horní Líštná / Leszna Górna

(*) In some cases there have been added exonyms to show the relationship between the towns more clearly for people not familiar with the respective languages.

Poland-Ukraine
 Dziewięcierz / Devyatyr (Дев'ятир)
 Uhrusk / Novouhruzke (Новоугрузьке)

Poland-Belarus
 Tokary / Tokary (Токари, Такары)
 Usnarz Górny / Usnar-Dolnyy (Уснар-Дольный)
 Minkowce / Minkovcy
 Nowodziel / Novodel

Czech Republic–Austria
 Český Heršlák / Deutsch Hörschlag
 České Velenice / Gmünd

Austria–Slovenia
 Bad Radkersburg / Gornja Radgona
 Deutschfeistritz / Slovenska Bistrica (Windischfeistritz)*
 Graz / Slovenj Gradec
 Deutschlandsberg / Podčetrtek (Windischlandsberg)*
 Oberdrauburg / Dravograd (Unterdrauburg)*
 Unterloibl / Podljubelj (Unterloibl)*

Italy–France
 Moncenisio / Lanslebourg-Mont-Cenis
 Briga Alta / La Brigue

Italy–Slovenia
 Gorizia / Nova Gorica

Italy–Switzerland
 Lavena Ponte Tresa / Ponte Tresa
 Cremenaga / Ponte Cremenaga
 Ponte Chiasso / Chiasso

Hungary–Slovakia
 Komárom / Komárno
 Sátoraljaújhely / Slovenské Nové Mesto
 Balassagyarmat / Slovenské Ďarmoty
 Esztergom / Štúrovo

Hungary–Romania
 Nagylak / Nădlac
 Újszalonta / Salonta

Hungary-Serbia
 Kelebia / Kelebija

Portugal–Spain
 Rio de Onor / Rihonor de Castilla

Sweden–Finland
 Karesuando / Kaaresuvanto
 Kuttainen / Kuttanen
 Katkesuando / Kätkäsuvanto
 Muonionalusta / Muonio
 Kihlangi / Kihlanki
 Pello / Pello
 Övertorneå / Ylitornio
 Karungi / Karunki

Estonia–Latvia
 Valga / Valka

Croatia–Bosnia and Herzegovina
 Hrvatska Kostajnica / Kostajnica
 Hrvatska Dubica / Kozarska Dubica
 Stara Gradiška / Gradiška
Dolina / Donja Dolina, Gornja Dolina
Orubica / Orubica
 Slavonski Kobaš / Kobaš
 Dubočac / Bosanski Dubočac
 Slavonski Brod / Brod
Svilaj / Donji Svilaj, Gornji Svilaj
 Slavonski Šamac / Šamac

Bosnia and Herzegovina–Serbia 
 Bosanska Rača / Sremska Rača
 Zvornik / Mali Zvornik

Bosnia and Herzegovina–Montenegro 
 Metaljka / Metaljka

Serbia–Romania
 Mali Žam / Jamu Mare
 Požeženo / Pojejena
 Veliki Gaj / Gaiu Mic

Romania–Ukraine
 Chilia Veche / Kiliya

Romania–Moldova
 Sculeni / Sculeni
 Ungheni / Ungheni

North America
Towns and cities listed have names of a common origin across an international boundary; matching pairs across provincial or state boundaries (such as Kansas City or Lloydminster) are common but are not listed here.

Canada–United States
 Beebe Plain, Quebec / Beebe Plain, Vermont
 Niagara Falls, Ontario / Niagara Falls, New York
 Sault Ste. Marie, Ontario / Sault Ste. Marie, Michigan
 North Portal, Saskatchewan / Portal, North Dakota
 Madawaska County, New Brunswick / Madawaska, Maine

United States–Mexico
 Calexico, California / Mexicali, Baja California
 Tecate, California / Tecate, Baja California
 Naco, Arizona / Naco, Sonora
 Nogales, Arizona / Nogales, Sonora
 San Luis, Arizona / San Luis Río Colorado, Sonora
 El Paso, Texas / Ciudad Juárez, Chihuahua (formerly El Paso del Norte, 1852–1888)
 Boquillas, Texas / Boquillas del Carmen, Coahuila
 Laredo, Texas / Nuevo Laredo, Tamaulipas
 Progreso, Texas / Nuevo Progreso, Tamaulipas

South America

Argentina–Chile
 Antofagasta de la Sierra / Antofagasta
 Coquimbito / Coquimbo
 San Sebastián

Brazil–Argentina
 Foz do Iguaçu / Puerto Iguazú

Brazil–Bolivia
 Guajará-Mirim / Guayaramerín

Brazil–French Guiana
 Oiapoque / Saint-Georges-de-l'Oyapock

Brazil–Uruguay
 Chuí / Chuy
 Acegua / Aceguá

Africa

Ethiopia–Kenya
 Moyale / Moyale

Central African Republic–Democratic Republic of the Congo
 Mobaye / Mobayi-Mbongo

Gabon–Equatorial Guinea
 Cocobeach / Cogo

Republic of the Congo–Democratic Republic of the Congo
 Loukolela/Lukolela

Malawi–Mozambique
 Mulanje / Milange

Zambia–Zimbabwe
 Chirundu / Chirundu

Zimbabwe–Mozambique
 Mukumbura / Mucumbara

Asia

Azerbaijan–Iran
 Astara / Astara
 Julfa / Julfa
 Biləsuvar / Bileh Savar

China–Hong Kong SAR
 Luohu District / Lowu
 Shatoujiao Subdistrict / Sha Tau Kok

China–Kazakhstan
 Khorgas / Khorgas

Georgia–Turkey
 Sarpi / Sarp

Malaysia-Thailand
 Padang Besar / Padang Besar (ปาดังเบซาร์)

Oman–UAE
 Dibba
 Al Buraimi-Al Ain

Oman–Yemen
Al-Mazyunah-Shahan District

Tajikistan–Afghanistan
 Ishkoshim / Ishkashim

See also
 List of divided cities
 Transborder agglomeration

Divided cities